Sardoal is a municipality in the district of Santarém in Portugal. The population in 2011 was 3,939, in an area of 92.15 km².

The present Mayor is Miguel Borges, elected by the Social Democratic Party. The municipal holiday is September 22.

Parishes

Administratively, the municipality is divided into 4 civil parishes (freguesias):
 Alcaravela
 Santiago de Montalegre
 Sardoal
 Valhascos

References

External links
 Photos from Sardoal

Towns in Portugal
Populated places in Santarém District
Municipalities of Santarém District